The United States House of Representatives elections in California, 1950 was an election for California's delegation to the United States House of Representatives, which occurred as part of the general election of the House of Representatives on November 7, 1950. Republicans won one Democratic-held seat.

Overview

Results
Final results from the Clerk of the House of Representatives:

District 1

District 2

District 3

District 4

District 5

District 6

District 7

District 8

District 9

District 10

District 11

District 12

District 13

District 14

District 15

District 16

District 17

District 18

District 19

District 20

District 21

District 22

District 23

See also 
82nd United States Congress
Political party strength in California
Political party strength in U.S. states
1950 United States House of Representatives elections

References 
California Elections Page
Office of the Clerk of the House of Representatives

External links 
California Legislative District Maps (1911-Present)
RAND California Election Returns: District Definitions

1950
California
United States House of Representatives